Live It Up is the major-label debut studio album, and third overall, by American Idol season nine winner, Lee DeWyze. The album was released on November 16, 2010, in the United States by RCA Records.

Recording
After winning the ninth season of American Idol on May 27, 2010, DeWyze signed a recording contract with 19 Entertainment and RCA Records. He started recording soon after and continued during the American Idols LIVE! Tour and completed in early October 2010. He worked with Toby Gad, John Shanks, Espionage, and other producers. DeWyze co-wrote ten of the eleven songs on Live It Up. He explained about the album and work:

"To see my name listed in the credits on each song was really important to me because I’m a songwriter. I also loved working with such talented writers. They all brought so much to the table and really helped me flesh out my sound. I grew up listening to Simon & Garfunkel, The Mamas & the Papas, Cat Stevens, and Kris Kristofferson. I love hard-edged vocals over pretty melodies — that’s what I’m about.″

Singles
The first single, "Sweet Serendipity," premiered  on On Air with Ryan Seacrest on October 13, 2010. The song went for adds on hot adult contemporary radio stations on October 25, 2010 and became available for download at digital music vendors on October 26, 2010.
DeWyze performed "Beautiful Like You", the second single from the album, on the American Idol Season 10 Top 12 Results show on March 17, 2011.

Critical reception

Upon its release, Live It Up received generally mixed reviews from most music critics. At Metacritic, which assigns a normalized rating out of 100 to reviews from mainstream critics, the album received an average score of 45, based on 4 reviews, which indicates "mixed or average reviews".

Stephen Thomas Erlewine of Allmusic gave the album a mixed review saying, "DeWyze can wrangle a pleasant melody, particularly when he’s favoring sunswept SoCal folk-pop, but he can’t resist sabotaging his slight charms with a studied hamminess, adopting a gravelly growl whenever he wants to appear soulful and leaning so hard in his phrasing that he stumbles instead of shuffles."

Commercial performance
Live It Up sold 39,000 copies in its first week, debuting at number nineteen on the Billboard 200. The album spent 10 consecutive weeks on the Billboard 200 and, after an eight-week absence, returned to the chart at number 96 following DeWyze's performance on the American Idol Season 10 Top 12 Results show. As of August 12, 2013, the album has sold 153,000 copies in the United States.  DeWyze's album is also the second album of an American Idol winner (after Kris Allen's self-titled debut, which premiered and peaked at number eleven) to not debut in the top ten of the Billboard 200.

Track listing

Personnel
Adapted from AllMusic.

Vocals
Chris DeStefano – background vocals
Lee DeWyze – background vocals, lead vocals
David Glass – background vocals

Musicians
Kenny Aronoff – drums
busbee – bass
David Glass – drums, Fender Rhodes, acoustic guitar, electric guitar, keyboards, percussion, piano, synthesizer
David Hodges – guitar, percussion, piano 
Charlie Judge – keyboards, synthesizer
Shawn Pelton – drums
John Shanks – bass, guitar, keyboards

Production

Jeff Aldrich – A&R
Amund Bjørklund – engineer
Dan Chase – programming
Chris DeStefano – engineer, instrumentation, producer, programming 
Lars Fox – Pro Tools
Toby Gad – instrumentation, mixing, producer, programming, vocal engineer
Chris Garcia – vocal producer
Serban Ghenea – mixing
David Glass –  producer 
David Hodges – engineer, producer
Ted Jensen – mastering
Espen Lind – engineer
Manny Marroquin – mixing
Francis Murray – mastering
Ross Petersen – engineer 
Iain Pirie – A&R
Christian Plata – assistant
Tim Roberts – assistant, mixing assistant
Jeff Rothschild – engineer, mixing, programming
John Shanks – producer
Shari Sutcliffe – project coordinator

Imagery
Dee Anderson – stylist
Erwin Gorostiza – creative director 
Jilan O'Neil – groomer
Christina Rodriguez – art direction
Jiro Schneider – photography

Charts

Chart positions

Sales

References

2010 albums
19 Recordings albums
Albums produced by Toby Gad
Albums produced by John Shanks
Lee DeWyze albums
RCA Records albums